Help! Help! is a 1912 short American silent comedy film directed by Mack Sennett.

Cast 
 Fred Mace - Mr. Suburbanite
 Mabel Normand - Mrs. Suburbanite
 Dell Henderson - Office Worker
 Edward Dillon - Office Worker
 Alfred Paget - Burglar
 W. C. Robinson - Burglar

References

External links 

1912 films
1912 short films
American silent short films
Films directed by Mack Sennett
American black-and-white films
Silent American comedy films
1912 comedy films
American comedy short films
1910s American films